Mzoli's  was a butchery in Gugulethu, a township on the outskirts of Cape Town, South Africa. Since Mzoli's opened in early 2003, the restaurant had become a popular gathering spot for Cape Town residents and a tourist attraction. Amongst Gugulethu's residents, Mzoli's Place has a reputation for public drunkenness and disrespect for the local community. Mzoli's is named after the founder and owner, Mzoli Ngcawuzele. The restaurant closed indefinitely in May 2021 partly due to the impact of the COVID-19 pandemic.

History 
The establishment opened in early 2003. Owner Mzoli Ngcawuzele obtained start-up funding from the Development Bank of South Africa, which supports black-owned businesses. In October 2006, an economic study said that Mzoli had "moved, from selling meat informally from a garage, to owning one of the most popular hangouts in Cape Town".

On November 19, 2006, more than 40 people including a group of tourists and Democratic Alliance councillor Masizole Mnqasela, were arrested in a police raid for drinking in public. The restaurant did not sell alcohol, but Ngcawuzele explained that he could not stop people from bringing their own. Magistrate Donald Grobler accepted Mnqasela's evidence and he received 100,000 South African rand after winning his civil case against the police.

Some local residents near a long-planned shopping mall that is being built by a business partly owned by Mzoli's owner criticized his plans in 2008. Some businesses were legally evicted or threatened with eviction from older buildings owned by Mzoli, which were then knocked down to make room for the new property development.

In 2018, Mzoli's was temporarily closed due to a car in front of the butchery being set alight in a protest for better housing. In 2020, amidst rumours that Mzoli Ngcawuzele had died, the Daily Sun reported that he was "still alive and well"  and was celebrating his 66th birthday. In May 2021, the restaurant was closed indefinitely.
Mzoli Ngcawuzele's daughter Sisanda Mangele said it closed due to "a lot of things, from physical safety to the state of the economy and restrictions of the pandemic".

Reception 

Mzoli's also provided live entertainment and has become noted as a venue for deep house and kwaito music. As well as local people, Mzoli's attracted television stars, DJs such as DJ Fresh, politicians such as Tony Yengeni, businesspeople, tourists, and college students.

British chef Jamie Oliver featured Mzoli's on the cover of his magazine in April 2009. He described Mzoli's as "sexy" and praised the "incredible flavor" of its grilled meat. He added that due to the hot temperature in South Africa they can't hang meat like in Europe so they would just kill it, gut it, skin it and eat it. Tina Walsh of The Guardian called it "a big open-air shack" which "has a devoted following".

In 2016, the Travel Channel show Secret Eats with Adam Richman featured a segment at Mzoli's during the episode "Clock and Dagger" which was filmed in Cape Town.

See also
 List of butcher shops
 List of restaurants in South Africa

Notes

References 

Black-owned restaurants
2003 establishments in South Africa
2021 disestablishments in South Africa
Buildings and structures in Cape Town
Butcher shops
Food and drink companies based in Cape Town
Restaurants disestablished in 2021
Restaurants established in 2003
Restaurants in South Africa
Defunct restaurants
Shops in South Africa
Tourist attractions in Cape Town
Restaurants disestablished during the COVID-19 pandemic